State Route 99 (SR 99) is a north–south state highway in the U.S. state of California, stretching almost the entire length of the Central Valley. From its southern end at Interstate 5 (I-5) near Wheeler Ridge to its northern end at SR 36 near Red Bluff, SR 99 goes through the densely populated eastern parts of the valley. Cities served include Bakersfield, Delano, Tulare, Visalia, Fresno, Madera, Merced, Turlock, Modesto, 
Manteca, Stockton, Sacramento, Yuba City, and Chico.

The highway is a remnant of the former Mexico to Canada U.S. Route 99 (US 99), which was decommissioned in 1972 after being functionally replaced by I-5 for long-distance traffic. The entire segment from Wheeler Ridge to Sacramento has been upgraded as of January 2016 to a freeway at least four lanes wide, and the California Department of Transportation (Caltrans) plans to further upgrade the segment to a minimum width of six lanes and also bring it into compliance with Interstate Highway standards as a parallel route to I-5 for Los Angeles–Sacramento traffic. North of Sacramento, the road ranges from a rural two-lane road to a four-lane freeway, with much of it following the route formerly designated as US 99E.

Route description

SR 99 is part of the California Freeway and Expressway System, and except for a small portion north of SR 20 is part of the National Highway System, a network of highways that are considered essential to the country's economy, defense, and mobility by the Federal Highway Administration.

Wheeler Ridge to Sacramento

From its southern terminus at I-5 in Wheeler Ridge (Wheeler Ridge Interchange) to Sacramento, SR 99 is designated as the Golden State Highway. It passes through the major cities of the San Joaquin Valley, including Bakersfield, Delano, Tulare, Visalia, Fresno, Madera, Merced, Modesto, and Stockton. The entirety of this segment is now built to freeway standards with complete access control, although some older portions are not yet in compliance with Interstate Highway standards. The freeway sections connect and serve the agriculture and industry of the California Central Valley, connecting agricultural production with processing and packing businesses. Most of the freeway also parallels the Union Pacific's Fresno Subdivision.

The portion of the highway between Fresno and Madera has also been designated the 100th Infantry Battalion Memorial Highway, honoring the U.S. Army unit that was composed almost entirely with American soldiers of Japanese ancestry when it fought during World War II.

The portion between Salida and Manteca is designated the 442nd Regimental Combat Team Memorial Highway, honoring the US Army infantry regiment that, like the 100th Infantry Battalion, was also composed almost entirely of American soldiers of Japanese ancestry during World War II.

In Sacramento, SR 99 joins with I-80 Business as part of the Capital City Freeway, then runs concurrently with I-5. Caltrans route logs for SR 99 do not recognize these concurrencies and lists the route as having two segments. However, the highway is often shown with the concurrencies on maps, as a contiguous highway. Signage exists at the two Sacramento interchanges to direct traffic from one segment to the other.

North Sacramento to Red Bluff

SR 99 then splits from I-5 in northern Sacramento, and then heads along the eastern side of the Sacramento Valley through Yuba City, and Chico to its northern terminus at SR 36 near Red Bluff. SR 99 remains a four-lane freeway as the route leaves Sacramento County, but shortly reverts to a four-lane divided expressway as the highway crosses into Sutter County. As SR 99 reaches the junction of SR 70, the route turns northwest by north and becomes an undivided expressway with the exceptions of crossing the Feather River near Nicolaus and the interchange with SR 113, where the route then turns straight north to Yuba City.

As SR 99 crosses SR 20 at a signaled intersection, the highway becomes a four-lane freeway for  before reverting to a two-lane road, passing the smaller towns of Live Oak, Fagan, and Gridley. SR 99 briefly is a local four-lane road through Gridley before continuing as a two-lane highway. SR 99 passes by the western side of the Thermalito Afterbay. SR 162 joins SR 99 for  before splitting off east towards the northern end of the Thermalito Afterbay. SR 99 then transitions from a two-lane road to a four-lane divided expressway just before the interchange at SR 149 turning northwest and eventually a freeway entering the Chico city limits. As SR 99 leaves Chico, the highway reverts to a 2-lane road before crossing into Tehama County and passing through rural areas and the town of Los Molinos.

History

From initial construction to U.S. Route 99

The first state highway bond issue, approved by the state's voters in 1910, included a north–south highway through the central part of the state consisting of Route 3 through the Sacramento Valley from the Oregon state line south to Sacramento, replacing the Siskiyou Trail, and Route 4 through the San Joaquin Valley from Sacramento to Los Angeles. In addition, a second route followed the west side of the Sacramento Valley, using Route 7 from Red Bluff south to Davis and the short Route 8 east along the proposed Yolo Causeway to Sacramento. North of Bakersfield these closely paralleled some of the main lines of the Southern Pacific Railroad, including the Fresno Line, East and West Valley lines, Shasta Line and Siskiyou Line.

By 1920 paving of both routes from Red Bluff to Los Angeles was completed or in progress, including the only mountain crossing south of Red Bluff, the Ridge Route just north of Los Angeles. To the north of Red Bluff, the road was being graded but had not yet been paved over the Siskiyou Mountains into Oregon. Paving was finally completed in mid-1933, when a new alignment (now SR 263) opened through the Shasta River Canyon.

The route from Davis to Oregon via Routes 7 and 3 came to be known as part of the Pacific Highway, an auto trail organized in 1910 to connect Canada and Mexico. The split in the Sacramento Valley was known as the East and West Side highways (the latter also carrying the Pacific Highway). South of Sacramento Route 4 was the Valley Route, but the San Joaquin Valley Tourist and Travel Association held a contest to rename it, selecting Golden State Highway as the winning entry in July 1927. To this day, "Golden State Highway" is SR 99's default name in areas not given other names by the Legislature, and the name continues from its end at Wheeler Ridge on I-5 as the Golden State Freeway from there to downtown Los Angeles.

This north–south central highway became part of US 99 in 1926, as part of the new United States Numbered Highway System developed by the American Association of State Highway Officials (AASHO), though signs were not posted in California until 1928. US 99 also continued southeast from Los Angeles along a paved state highway, Route 9 and 26, to US 80 in El Centro. The paved county road south from El Centro to the Mexican border became a state highway in mid-1931, and part of US 99 in mid-1932.

In mid-1929, AASHO approved a split designation between Sacramento and Red Bluff, with US 99W replacing the original western route via Davis, and US 99E following the East Side Highway (Route 3) via Roseville. A short-lived split also existed between Manteca and Stockton in the early 1930s, with US 99E becoming the main route and US 99W becoming an extended SR 120 where not concurrent with US 50.

A third highway heading north from Sacramento was constructed by the Natomas Company in the 1910s for  along the Sacramento River levee to provide access to land reclaimed and sold by the company. Sacramento and Sutter counties continued the road alongside the Sacramento River and Feather River to Nicolaus, where an existing county road crossed the river on a drawbridge and ran north to the East Side Highway at Yuba City. This continuous roadway between Sacramento and Yuba City was dedicated in October 1924 as the Garden Highway.

Parts of the present SR 99 alignment between Sacramento and Yuba City were added to the state highway system in 1933, when the legislature added Route 87 (Sign Route 24, later US 40 Alternate) from Woodland north past Yuba City to northwest of Oroville, and in 1949, with the creation of Route 232 (later Sign Route 24) between Sacramento and Marysville. The final piece became Route 245 (no signed number) in 1959, connecting Route 232 near Catlett with Route 87 near Tudor, and following the old Garden Highway across the Feather River to a point east of Tudor. Despite this combined route connecting the same cities as the Garden Highway, the only other piece of the old county road taken for the state highway was a short segment just north of Sacramento, carrying Route 232 between Jibboom Street and El Centro Road.

As a state route

When the Interstate Highway System was being planned in the 1950s, there were two proposals as to which way to route a freeway through the San Joaquin Valley. One was to upgrade US 99 to Interstate standards. The other proposed alternative was the West Side Freeway, which would bypass all the Central Valley communities and thus provide a faster and more direct north–south route through the state. The latter route was eventually chosen and ultimately became Interstate 5.

The implementation of the Interstate Highway System and the mid-1964 state highway renumbering ultimately sealed the fate of the U.S. Highway designation on US 99. The Interstates eventually replaced portions of US 99, causing it to be truncated at both of its ends. 

US 99 was truncated to Los Angeles, with the old route south to Mexico becoming mainly I-10 and SR 86. At the same time Route 99 was defined legislatively to run from I-5 near Wheeler Ridge to Red Bluff, but it was only marked as SR 99 between Sacramento and Yuba City, since the remainder was still US 99 or US 99E. The southern end of US 99 was moved further north to Sacramento in late 1966 and SR 99 was extended to Wheeler Ridge; the rest of former US 99 to Los Angeles was either I-5 or the locally maintained San Fernando Road. Several years later US 99 and its branches were removed altogether from California, making SR 99 signage match the legislative definition; all of US 99W, and US 99 north of Red Bluff, remained as other routes (I-80, SR 113, and I-5), while US 99E between Roseville and Marysville became SR 65. By 1968, all US 99 signs were removed or replaced with SR 99 signs following the completion of I-5.

During the 20th century, Caltrans gradually widened Route 99 into a four-lane expressway for the length of the entire segment from Wheeler Ridge to Sacramento.  The agency did not immediately upgrade Route 99 to a freeway, since the West Side Freeway had already been selected as the preferred alternative for north-south long-distance traffic.  As traffic levels along the Route 99 corridor continued to increase, the at-grade intersections on the expressway became extremely dangerous.  Drivers on cross-streets who needed to cross the expressway often had to wait for many minutes at those intersections to find suitable gaps in which to dart across heavy through traffic on Route 99 moving at near-freeway speeds.  If drivers became impatient or mistimed the speed of through traffic, the result was often a dangerous side collision.  Therefore, Caltrans upgraded or replaced those intersections one-by-one with freeway interchanges, and often added frontage roads for access to adjacent parcels.  This work proceeded very slowly over several decades, as Caltrans needed to balance the rising level of danger at the rural intersections on Route 99 with other urgent construction priorities in California's rapidly growing metropolitan areas.

By 2012, there was only one remaining expressway segment with at-grade intersections on Route 99 between Sacramento and Wheeler Ridge, in Merced County between the cities of Chowchilla and Atwater.  On December 11, 2012, Caltrans commenced construction on a project to upgrade that segment to a six-lane freeway with full access control. On January 15, 2016, Caltrans officially opened the Plainsburg Road interchange, which completed the conversion of Route 99 south of Sacramento to a freeway built to near-interstate standards.

Future
Caltrans' long-range plans recommend that SR 99 be upgraded to Interstate Highway standards between its southern end and Sacramento, which would require upgrading some substandard sections. Caltrans once suggested the route could be designated as either I-7 or I-9, in accordance with the Interstate Highway System's numbering standards (being just east of and parallel to I-5). However, the freeway is not currently part of the Interstate Highway system

Junction list

Business routes

Bakersfield

State Route 99 Business (SR 99 Bus.) in the city of Bakersfield follows Union Avenue and Golden State Avenue. Traveling north on SR 99, the business route begins at exit 11 (Union Avenue), and follows the original routing of US 99. Union Avenue is a rural, four-lane road for about  until it enters Greenfield at Panama Road. From there, it continues north, passing by the Bakersfield Municipal Airport and the Kern County Fairgrounds. Union Avenue widens to six lanes at Ming Avenue, just a few miles before its intersection with SR 58. At the SR 58 junction, the designation SR 204 is added to the route. SR 99 Bus./SR 204 continues north on Union Avenue until the Union Avenue Y-intersection, where the designation heads northwest on Golden State Avenue. The route passes under SR 178 and over Chester Avenue at Garces Memorial Circle. At F Street, SR 99 Bus./SR 204 becomes a short four-lane freeway that terminates at SR 99 just before the Olive Drive exit.

See also

Tule fog

Notes

References

External links

Route 99 highway conditions at California Department of Transportation
Route 99 at California Highways
July 24, 2005, San Francisco Chronicle article on Interstate upgrade
California 99 at AARoads.com
Virtual Tour of US 99 north of Los Angeles
Historic Highway 99 Association of California

099
Historic trails and roads in California
099
099
State Route 099
State Route 099
State Route 099
State Route 099
State Route 099
State Route 099
State Route 099
State Route 099
State Route 099
State Route 099
State Route 099
State Route 099
State Route 099
State Route 099
California State Route 099
State Route 099
Streets in Visalia, California
Transportation in Visalia, California